Richard L. Baldinger (born December 31, 1959 in Camp Lejeune, North Carolina) is a former professional American football player. An offensive lineman, he played  twelve seasons in the National Football League, mainly for the Kansas City Chiefs. Since retiring as a player, Baldinger has served as a color commentator for CBS (2004–06) and Big Ten Network (2007).

His younger brother Gary Baldinger was his teammate with the Chiefs and also played at Wake Forest. His other brother Brian Baldinger also played in the NFL and was a commentator for Fox.

Like his brothers, he graduated from Massapequa High School.

See also
History of the New York Giants (1979-1993)

References

External links
NFL.com player page

1959 births
Living people
People from Camp Lejeune, North Carolina
American football offensive linemen
Wake Forest Demon Deacons football players
New York Giants players
Kansas City Chiefs players
New England Patriots players
College football announcers
National Football League announcers
Massapequa High School alumni
Ed Block Courage Award recipients